Odzaberd (meaning "Serpent's Fortress"; formerly Teyseba referring to the Urartian fortification and named after the god Teisheba; also known as Ishkanaberd meaning "Lord's Fortress") is located upon a hill east of the town of Tsovinar and at the south-east corner of Lake Sevan in the Gegharkunik Province of Armenia.

Teyseba 
Teyseba (later Ishkanaberd meaning "Lord's Fortress" and Odzaberd meaning "Serpent's Fortress") is located east of the town of Tsovinar and at the south-east corner of Lake Sevan in the Gegharkunik Province of Armenia.  It is an important archaeological site because it was once a fortified city of the Urartian Kingdom founded by Rusa I between 735 and 713 BC, and is considered the best preserved Urartian fortification in the Sevan basin.  Amongst the ruins, stone foundations and portions of the city wall and gates are still visible.  There is also an entrance to a small cave located on the western face of the hill within the ruins of Teyseba.

Carved into the rock face on a low cliff at the base of the hill which the city was built upon (located north and along the road), is an ancient cuneiform inscription written by Rusa I.  It relates that the city was built in dedication to the god Teisheba and speaks of the conquest by Rusa I of twenty-three nations as well.  The etymology of Sevan was also found in the inscription and is considered to be the first such mention of the word that now relates to the lake that the ruins are located.

Local folklore tells that Lake Sevan was at a much higher elevation during this time, and that the city of Teyseba had been built along its shoreline.  During the Soviet era the lake was lowered 19 meters, and has now stabilized to 20 meters (65 feet) below where it once was.  It is said that the cuneiform inscription had been carved into the cliff face to prevent it from being defaced.  Due to the water level being so much higher at the time, the location of the inscription would have been virtually inaccessible.

It is also said that what is now a modern cemetery located on a rocky outcrop north of the village of Tsovinar, was during Urartian times an island with a small village that had been destroyed by lava flow that came up from below the lake.  Local residents tell that ancient coins and bones have been found when digging new graves in the cemetery.  The island has since dwindled in size.

During the medieval period, one of the lords of the land rebuilt the stone defences to serve as his fortress at the same site and it went by the name Ishkanaberd meaning "Lord's Fortress". It was taken by the lord of the nearby town of Khrber because of a dispute between the two over his wife.  After destroying the fortress he said, “Now nothing shall live in this land except snakes and scorpions!”  It was referred to henceforth as Odzaberd meaning “Serpent’s Fortress”.

Folklore 

During the medieval period, the lord of the land rebuilt the ancient stone defences of Teyseba to serve as his fortress.  It went by the name Ishkanaberd, meaning "Lord's Fortress".  Ishkanaberd was situated approximately eight kilometers northwest from another fortified town referred to as Karmrashen or "Khrber" by local residents. The name Khrber is derived from the local dialect of the villages surrounding southeast Lake Sevan and roughly translates to “ruins”.  Foundations of stone structures, walls of a church, large tombs and a medieval graveyard may still be seen at ancient Karmrashen which sits nestled in the mountains near Lake Sevan.  There is also a late 14th-century monument named Yot Verk Matur meaning "Seven Wounds Chapel", dedicated to seven lords of seven villages who were killed during the invasions of Timur Lenk.

Local folklore tells that the lord of Karmrashen had a wife, and that the lord of Ishkanaberd sought to have her as his own even though he was already married.  An affair ensued between the two, and before long the lord of Karmrashen discovered this and became furious.  The ruler declared that he would destroy Ishkanaberd, which was considered impenetrable because of its very thick defensive walls.

The lord of Ishkanaberd's wife had also learned of the affair and while he was sleeping, she bound him so that he could not escape and went to let her husband's rival into the walled fortress.  The wife of the lord of Karmrashen whom the other lord was having an affair with learned what had happened and came to free her lover.  She successfully did so and the two of them escaped with their lives from Ishkanaberd that night on horseback through a cave and tunnel located in close proximity to the fortress.  The cave may still be seen to this day and the entrance is quite large.  It is said that during those days the tunnel to the cave led from Ishkanaberd to a village some distance away, and that the tunnel which has since collapsed could fit a person sitting on horseback from one end to the other.

Ishkanaberd was destroyed by the other lord who proclaimed, “Now nothing shall live in this land except snakes and scorpions!”  Therefore the name was referred to henceforth as Odzaberd meaning “Serpent’s Fortress”.

Folklore from the village of Tsovinar also tells that there was a ceramic pipe situated subsurface that led from the foothills nearby to Ishkanaberd.  During medieval times invasions were a threat in and around the villages, and prevented shepherds from venturing into them to bring their milk.  So they instead sent milk from the mountains to the village via a ceramic pipeline.

References

Sources
 
 
 

Archaeological sites in Armenia
Castles in Armenia
Forts in Armenia
Tourist attractions in Gegharkunik Province
Buildings and structures in Gegharkunik Province